WLAY may refer to:

WLAY (AM), a radio station (1450 AM) licensed to Muscle Shoals, Alabama, United States
WLAY-FM, a radio station (100.1 FM) licensed to Littleville, Alabama, United States
What I Like About You (TV series), a 2002-2006 The WB television series starring Jennie Garth and Amanda Bynes